Nevzat Halili (born September 15, 1946), is a Macedonian politician and teacher of English. Halili was first elected to the Macedonian parliament in 1991 and is a member of the Party for Democratic Prosperity.  In an open letter to president Kiro Gligorov in 1993, Halili argued that the Albanians in Macedonia were discriminated against in the state administration and the public sector. He was minister without portfolio in the second government of Branko Crvenkovski (1994-1998). During the 1990s, Halili was sentenced to prison for participation in demonstrations and preventing police officers from exercising their duty.

In 2001, Halili joined the National Democratic Party established by Kastriot Haxhirexha and Xhezair Shaqiri ("Commander Hoxha"). He was later linked with several paramilitary organisations campaigning for the unification of Albanian-populated territories in the Balkans. On 2 July 2002, the US state Department blocked the assets of Halili for providing leadership or material support to armed insurgents in the western Balkans. This activity threatened international stabilisation efforts in the region. Halili was arrested in 2006 in Prishtina on suspicions of arms trafficking, but was released after eight months in custody.

In January 1992, the Republic of Ilirida, a territorial entity, was self-proclaimed by Nevzat Halili and other Albanian activists in Struga. The republic would cover approximatively half of Macedonia's territory and aimed at uniting all Albanians under former Yugoslavia. Later on, the aim of the republic was that of favoring the federalization of Macedonia.

On 19 September 2014, Halili read out a declaration of an "independent Republic of Ilirida" at Skanderbeg Square in Skopje to a few dozen ethnic Albanians.

References

Albanian nationalism in North Macedonia
People from Tetovo Municipality
Albanians in North Macedonia
1946 births
Living people
Albanian separatism
Albanian nationalists